Anton Hegner  (2 March 1861 – 4 December 1915) was a Danish cellist and composer.

Life
Hegner was born in Denmark and started his musical career as a violinist, but changed to the cello as he was educated at the Royal Danish Academy of Music, from where he graduated in 1879.

He moved to New york in 1893. He was often back in Europe, however, often playing at the various courts and concert halls around the continent. During visits to the Danish court he sometimes played together with members of the Danish, Russian and British royal families.

He was appointed a Knight of the Order of the Dannebrog in 1902.

See also
List of Danish composers

References
This article was initially translated from the Danish Wikipedia.

External links

Danish composers
Male composers
1861 births
1915 deaths